The Hulihee Palace is located in historic Kailua-Kona, Hawaii, on Ali'i Drive. The former vacation home of Hawaiian royalty, it was converted to a museum run by the Daughters of Hawaii, showcasing furniture and artifacts. It is located at 75–5718 Alii Drive, Kailua-Kona.

History

The palace was originally built out of lava rock by John Adams Kuakini (governor of the island of Hawaii) during the Hawaiian Kingdom. When he died in 1844 he left it to his hānai (adopted) son William Pitt Leleiohoku I, the son of Prime Minister William Pitt Kalanimoku. Leleiohoku died in the measles epidemic of 1848 and left it to his son John William Pitt Kīnaʻu, but he died young and the palace went to his mother Princess Ruth Keʻelikōlani. Ruth made Hulihee her chief residence for most of her life, but she preferred to sleep in a grass hut on the palace grounds rather than in the palace. She invited all of the reigning monarchs to vacation at Hulihee, from Kamehameha III to Liliʻuokalani. Ruth died and left the palace to her cousin and sole heir Princess Bernice Pauahi Bishop.

It was later sold to King Kalākaua and Queen Kapiolani. Kalākaua renamed the palace Hikulani Hale, which means “House of the Seventh ruler,” referring to himself, the seventh monarch of the monarchy that began with King Kamehameha I.  In 1885, King Kalākaua had the palace plastered over the outside to give the building a more refined appearance. After Kalākaua's death it passed to Kapiolani who left Hulihee Palace to her two nephews, Prince Jonah Kūhiō Kalanianaʻole Piʻikoi and Prince David Kawānanakoa.  In 1927 the Daughters of Hawaii, a group dedicated to preserving the cultural legacy of the Hawaiian Islands, restored Hulihee Palace and turned it into a museum. It was added to the National Register of Historic Places listings on the island of Hawaii in 1973 as site 73000653.

The palace's walls and ceiling had cracks following the 2006 Kiholo Bay earthquake that was centered on the Kohala coast. The structural damage and cracks in the lava rock and plaster caused by the 2006 earthquake were repaired a few years later.

Images

References

External links 

 The Hulihee Palace official web site

Royal residences in Hawaii
Houses on the National Register of Historic Places in Hawaii
Historic house museums in Hawaii
Museums in Hawaii County, Hawaii
Houses in Hawaii County, Hawaii
Historic American Buildings Survey in Hawaii
Houses completed in 1838
1838 establishments in Hawaii
National Register of Historic Places in Hawaii County, Hawaii
Kailua-Kona, Hawaii